Xiong Zhaozheng (born December 1953) is a Chinese novelist.

Biography
Xiong was born in Yingshan County, Hubei in December 1953. He worked in Yingshan Culture Centre by age 22. Xiong started to publish works in 1973.

In 1981, Xiong was transferred from Yingshan County to Wuhan. From 1984 to 1986, Xiong served as an associate editor in Changjiang Literature and Art.

In 1993, Xiong started to write his historical novel, Zhang Juzheng, which won the Mao Dun Literature Prize in 2005.

Works

Novellas
 Drunkard

Novels
 Zhang Juzheng

Proses and poems
 A Song for My Country
 In the Mountains
 A Song for the Girl
 Magic Bottle

Awards
 Zhang Juzheng – 6th Mao Dun Literature Prize (2005)

References

1953 births
People from Yingshan County, Hubei
Writers from Hubei
Living people
Mao Dun Literature Prize laureates
Chinese male novelists